Tresonče is a mountainous village located in the Mavrovo and Rostuša Municipality in western North Macedonia. It is a mountain village populated by Macedonian Orthodox Christians. There are also several Orthodox churches in the village.

Geography
Tresonče is on the Mount Bistra which is a national park for wildlife. In that region you can find brown bear, wild goat, wild boar, deer, and bobcat.

The climate of the village is continental with a lot of precipitation throughout the year.

The village is divided into the following mahala (quarters): Kadievci, Peškovci, Jodrovci, Lekovci, Jurukovci, Boškovci, Bradinovci, Vrlevci, Ekmedžievci, Krajnikovci, Srbinovci, Petrovci, Trizlovci and Kičevci

History 
The village is known to exist since 1467 (registered in an Ottoman book).  The inhabitants of the village are called Mijaks.  The Mijaks are divided as Muslims and Orthodox Christians. In 1467, the village was classified as a road keeping village, guarding the roads from criminals who took over land and stole cattle. From 1879 to 1912, Tresonče was part of the Manastir Vilayet of the Ottoman Empire.

Demographics
According to the statistics of the Bulgarian ethnographer Vasil Kanchov from 1900, 1320 inhabitants lived in the village of Tresonče, all Bulgarians. 

According to the Secretary of the Bulgarian Exarchate Dimitar Mišev ("La Macédoine et sa Population Chrétienne"), in 1905 there were 1680 Bulgarians (exarchists) in Tresonče.

The village is traditionally inhabited by the ethnographic group of Mijaks, the inhabitants identifying as ethnic Macedonians (as of the 2021 census; 24 inhabitants).

Notable people
 Dimitar Krstev, known as Dičo Zograf, icon painter 
 Dimitar Pandilov - Artist skilled in Macedonian arts, considered the founder of modern Macedonian art.
 Andrey Damyanov - Although not born in Tresonče, his family was from there, he was a very famous architect in North Macedonia.
Josif Mihajlović Jurukovski (1887–1941), mayor of Skopje, born in Tresonče
Toma Smiljanić-Bradina (1888–1969), Serbian ethnographer, philologist, dramatist and publicist, born in Tresonče
Sirma Voyvoda, Bulgarian rebel. Considered a national heroine in North Macedonia.

References

External links
Tresonče in the project "Explore Macedonia"

Villages in Mavrovo and Rostuša Municipality